The Bourbon Reforms consisted of political and economic changes promulgated by the Spanish Crown under various kings of the House of Bourbon, since 1700, mainly in the 18th century. The beginning of the new Crown's power with clear lines of authority to officials contrasted to the complex system of government that evolved under the Habsburg monarchs.  For example, the crown pursued state predominance over the Catholic Church, pushed economic reforms, and placed power solely into the hands of civil officials.

The reforms resulted in significant restructuring of administrative structure and personnel. The reforms were intended to stimulate manufacturing and technology to modernise Spain. In Spanish America, the reforms were designed to make the administration more efficient and to promote its economic, commercial and fiscal development. When looking at the material effects of how the Bourbon Reforms aimed to change the relationship between the Spanish American colonies and the Crown, it can be said that the reforms functionally aimed to transform juridically semi-autonomous groups into proper colonies. Specifically, the reforms sought to increase commercial agriculture and mining and increase trade. The system was intended to be much more hierarchal, forcing the colonies to become more dependent on Spain and serve as a market for their manufactured goods. The crown ordered these changes in hopes that it would have a positive effect on the economy of Spain. Furthermore, the Bourbon Reforms were intended to limit the power of Criollos and re-establish peninsular supremacy over the colonies.

The reforms achieved mixed results administratively but succeeded in alienating the local elites of the Americas (who called themselves Criollos) and eventually led to the independence of all overseas dominions of the Spanish crown. This is not to say that a clean and straight line can be drawn from the Bourbon reforms to the movements for Independence, but rather that the period of unrest that came in the wake of the reforms helped encourage the conditions necessary for local riots, and eventually revolts.

End of Habsburg era 
At the end of the 17th century, Spain was an ailing empire, facing declining revenues and the loss of military power, ruled by a weak king, Charles II, who left no successor. Even before his death in 1700, the European powers were already positioning themselves to see which noble house would succeed in placing someone on the Spanish throne and thereby gain its vast empire. Louis XIV of France asked for and received the Pope's consent for his grandson, Philip of Anjou, a great-nephew of Charles, to take the throne. On his deathbed, Charles willed the crown to the French-born successor, but an international conflict ensued, known as the War of the Spanish Succession, which lasted from 1702 to 1713 and pitted Portugal, England, and other European countries against the French House of Bourbon.

Beginning of Bourbon era 
Under the terms of the Treaty of Utrecht, which ended the War of Spanish Succession and placed Philip V securely on the Spanish throne, the new Bourbon dynasty was forced to make several concessions to outside powers. This included, in compromise with the Austrian Habsburgs, some of the Spanish Habsburg Empire's European territories, some Caribbean enclaves such as Jamaica, some of the Balearic islands and the continental stronghold of Gibraltar. 

It also included granting the asiento de negros, a monopoly contract on African slaves to Spanish colonies in the Americas to the British government.

Philip V of Spain, the first king of the House of Bourbon, took measures intended to counter the decline of Spanish power called the Bourbon Reforms. Even before the war, the state of the empire was precarious. When Charles II died, the military was practically nonexistent, consisting of only one division; the treasury was bankrupt; and there was no state promotion of commerce or industry. Philip V and his ministers needed to act quickly to reconstruct the empire.

French influence
The new Bourbon kings kept close ties with France and used many Frenchmen as advisors. French innovations in politics and social manners never fully replaced Spanish laws and traditions but became an important model in both areas. As a result, there was an influx of French goods, ideas, and books, which helped spread the ideas of the Enlightenment throughout the Spanish world. In a sense, all things French came into fashion during the subsequent century and gave rise to a new type of person, the afrancesado, who welcomed the new influence. In addition, during the War of Succession, the ports of Spanish America were blockaded by British and Dutch fleets. Spain turned to France for help with the export of its goods, which was the first time in Spanish colonial history that legal trade occurred with a foreign nation. Prior to this, trade between Spanish-American colonies and other European countries had all occurred on illicit trade circuits. The new commercial relationship stimulated the colonial economy, especially that of Chile.

In Mainland Spain

The early reforms were aimed at improving the economic and political structure of Spain. They sought to modernize agriculture, construction of ships, and infrastructure to monitor and incite economic integration and development on a regional and national level. The Spanish were caught in an ever tightening noose of imperial rivalry abroad with the British, the French, and the Portuguese. They were all fighting for domination in the Atlantic trade. Spain's issues with its neighbor was the biggest problem, and the Spanish Bourbons made constant short-term adjustments to colonial and increasingly, continental war-making. War was inevitable as the hegemonic powers were pinned against each other in a quest for expansion. This hindered the nationalization of industries and so disrupted the class system. For example, mercury, a Spanish import, was an essential resource for extracting silver in the mining process, but the French naval blockade dramatically limited imports in Spanish America. As a result,  silver plunged downward and mining slumped, which caused revenue to decrease. Ultimately, in 1805, the highland mining districts exploded in revolt. Therefore, it was not the Bourbon reforms that failed, but rather the role of the conflicts at home that resulted in failure.

The failure of reform measures became evident when Spain, under Charles III, lost the Seven Years' War with Great Britain (1756–1763). Charles III's counselors sought more detailed reports of Spain's overseas territories/and now understood the need to take them fully into account. The new wave of reforms included larger exploitation of resources in the colonies, increased taxes, the opening of new ports allowed to trade only with Spain, and the establishment of several state monopolies.

Spanish America

In Spanish America, José del Campillo y Cosío's Nuevo Sistema de gobierno económico para la América (New System of Economic Government for America) (1743) was a key text that shaped the reforms. He compared the colonial systems of Britain and France to that of Spain, as the first two nations reaped far greater benefits from their colonies than Spain. He advocated reforming Spain's economic relations with its overseas territories to a system more like the mercantilism of France's Jean-Baptiste Colbert (1619–1683).

The Bourbon reforms have been termed "a revolution in government" for their sweeping changes to the structure of the administration, which sought to strengthen the power of the Spanish state, decrease the power of local elites in favor of office holders from the Iberian peninsula, and increase revenues for the crown.

Government 
The bulk of the changes in Spanish America came in the second half of the 18th century following the visita general (general inspection) of New Spain (1765–1771) by José de Gálvez, who was later named Minister of the Indies. Upon his inspection, he found the viceroyalty in a shambles and then reorganized the tax collection system, rewarded loyal Spanish merchants, jailed corrupt tax collectors, and steered the local economy towards mining. The reforms attempted in New Spain were implemented elsewhere in Spanish America subsequently. There had been one earlier reform in the creation of the new Viceroyalty of New Granada (1717), carved out from the Viceroyalty of Peru to improve the administration of the overseas possessions. The new viceroyalty was created initially in 1717, suppressed just six years later, and then permanently established in 1739, still earlier than the reforms of the late 18th century. It was an administrative change that reflected the recognition (as early as the 16th century) that the northern area of South America had certain challenges of distance from Peru. There had been earlier creations of captaincies general in Guatemala and Venezuela, marking an increase in their importance. The addition of the viceroyalties in order to compensate for challenges of distance between northern South America and Peru also came about as a result of the need to protect the vital trade routes that existed between these regions. In 1776, a second jurisdiction, the Viceroyalty of Rio de la Plata was also carved out of the Viceroyalty of Peru in 1776 as part of José de Gálvez's comprehensive administrative reform. In the same year, an autonomous captaincy general was also established in Venezuela. Even after his time in the colonies, José de Gálvez joined the Council of the Indies and eventually rose to the top of that, effectively becoming the most influential figure in the legislation of colonial Americas.

Establishment of new viceroyalties also revealed a new revelation on the part of the Spanish crown: that there are huge circuits of illicit trade in Spanish America, and that it is in the best interest of the crown to incorporate these circuits of trade into the existing infrastructure. This way, the crown was now able to collect tax revenues from those circuits of trade that had previously eluded it. Although some analyze the Bourbon reforms by arguing that the purpose of the reform was to eliminate contraband trade and other illicit circuits of trade, a closer analysis of the material evidence available indicates that many of these circuits did not disappear, but were simply incorporated.

These consulados would resolve commercial disputes and develop the infrastructure of the colony. Moreover, the   would be in charge of trying to implement innovative economic projects. The   demonstrated an effort on the part of Spain that, unlike other Atlantic empires, seemed to make a real effort to integrate its American colonies as essential parts of not just Spain's colonial empire, but also as provinces of the monarchy and not simply faraway lands. Just as in many of the other changes made by the crown, the consulados also functioned to shift power away from the creole elite and into the hands of peninsular Spaniards. As the consulados controlled internal economic circuits, when the Creoles lost control of these roles in government they also lost much of their control of trade and economic systems, further destabilizing their established power in the colonies.

Another part of the Bourbon reforms targeted the set-up of the municipio itself. Specifically, the main plaza was a central figure in Hispanic colonial urbanism. In Spanish America, cities were planned around a central public square, and much of colonial life emanated from or was planned around that center. During the period of the Bourbon reforms, the Spanish crown wanted to switch from the Plaza Mayor model, in which the plaza was a central square that was a daily market and a space for public festivities, to the Plaza de Armas model, in which the plaza space would be cleared and devoted to martial activities. These reforms were characterized by a mixture of construction projects, relocations, and unfinished or unsuccessful projects. Although they were only partially applied, some aspects of these reform projects actually spilled over from colonial to republican times, post- independence. In fact, in both Mexico and Peru, the independent regimes assumed features of the Bourbon reform program in terms of the use and understanding of the plaza.

Under Charles III, colonial matters were concentrated in a single ministry, which took powers away from the Council of the Indies. Furthermore, the advances Americans (Criollos) had made in the local bureaucracy in the past century and a half, usually through the sale of offices, were checked by the direct appointment of (supposedly more qualified and disinterested) Spanish officials.

Charles III and Charles IV also reversed the advances that Criollos had made in the high courts (audiencias). Under the Habsburgs, the Crown had sold audiencia positions to Criollos. The Bourbon kings ended this policy. By 1807, “only twelve out of ninety-nine [audiencia] judges were creoles.”

Trade and the economy 
The War of Succession's main objective was to determine which European powers would dominate over the Atlantic trade. In 1713, the war ended with the Treaty of Utrecht which had significant impact on Spain's economic holdings. Spain lost some of its primary European possessions to the Austrian Habsburgs in addition to losing other territories such as the fortress of Sacramento, which brought the Portuguese in close proximity to Buenos Aires. In addition to its lost territory, Spain granted the asiento de negros, a monopoly contract on African slaves to Spanish colonies in the Americas to the British government. Granting the asiento not only led to a significant loss of revenue for the Spanish Crown, it also provided channels through which British merchants could deal in contraband trade. With these losses, Spain relied primarily on its American colonies to maintain its position as a European power.

The Bourbon Reforms transitioned Spain's economic policy to be increasingly mercantilist, an economic policy in which countries maximize their exports and minimize their imports to secure greater portion of wealth from a fixed amount in the world. This wealth was measured in the quantity that ended up in imperial treasuries.

An important goal of the Bourbon Reforms was to increase legal, registered trade with Spanish America in order to collect more tax revenue for the Crown, an aim that was frequently undercut both by the prevalence of contraband and the increasing presence of foreign merchants. One strategy to diminish this trade in contraband was the relocation in 1717 of the Casa de la Contratación. This was the House of Trade which oversaw Spanish trade with its colonies, and was moved from Seville, where traders frequently dealt in contraband, to Cádiz. However, this effort did not prove highly effective, as the trade of contraband simply moved with the Casa de la Contratación to Cádiz.

Then in 1778, the Free Trade Decree (Reglamento para el comercio libre) was passed. The crown believed that free and protected trade between Spain and the Americas was the best way to restore all sectors of the Spanish dominion to their former glory. Traditionally, many identify this act and this principle to be one of the cornerstone principles of the Bourbon reforms. The Free Trade decree opened all ports in the colonies to trade with Spanish controlled ports the colonies or Spain. This act in tandem with the crucial decision preceding it to open the islands of the Spanish Caribbean to all nine peninsular Spanish ports in 1765 helped establish the notion that the special privilege of trade that only a few ports had enjoyed earlier was to be no more. It is important to understand that the ‘free’ trade that was established by the Free Trade Decree was only free in a limited sense. There were geographic limitations both in Spain and in the Americas, most notably being the exclusion of Venezuela and New Spain.

A key reason for freeing trade was that King Charles wanted to remove the monopoly of Cádiz, a Spanish port, over trade with the Americas. Cádiz could not supply for the large demand in the Americas. He also wanted to end the Spanish Crown's financial dependence on this monopoly. Free trade was largely supported, notably by important ministers like Gálvez, a Spanish Visitador general, who argued for more commercial deregulation and the end of the monopoly of Cádiz in his paper entitled “Discurso y reflexiones de un vasallo sobre la decadencia de nuestras Indias españoles”. Another supporter of free trade was Esquilache's commercial policy commission, which on February 14, 1765, submitted a report advocating imperial free trade to replace the Cádiz monopoly.

Another goal was to more efficiently extract raw materials from Spanish America and create a captive Spanish American market for Spanish goods. The Bourbons, with the help of administrator José Patiño, implemented several new strategies aimed at streamlining the production and importation of Spanish American goods to Spain. One such strategy that proved highly profitable was the establishment of royal monopolies and trading companies as early as 1717 that controlled the production of export crops such as tobacco and sugar in Cuba and cacao in Venezuela. By charging higher prices for Spanish imports and paying lower prices for exports from Spanish America, these companies used their monopolies to generate rents that disproportionately benefited the Spanish mainland over its Spanish American colonies. For example, during the 1750s, the royal monopoly on Cuban tobacco generated a profit of more than 500 million pesos.

One of the testing grounds for this reformation of trade was in Venezuela. Starting in the 1730s, the monopoly on Venezuelan trade was held by the Royal Guipuzcoana company of Caracas. Frustrations with this company's monopoly were felt among the majority of Venezuela's population and culminated in a revolt against the company in 1749, led by Juan Francisco de León. The revolt created a temporary alliance between elite creoles, Canarians, pardos, natives, and free blacks. While these efforts were quickly extinguished by Spanish forces, the Bourbons did put limits on the power of the Guipuzcoana company following the revolt. However, these limits primarily benefited the Mantuano elites who were creoles that profited highly from the cacao trade.

In addition to changes to production, the nature of trade under the Bourbons, especially after 1740, also shifted – away from the Habsburg fleet system for shipping, which had many inefficiencies and was vulnerable to attack, and towards a single-ship system, which was more competitive with foreign merchants and opened up more Spanish American ports to transatlantic trade.

Tobacco proved to be a successful crop after state monopolies were expanded. Also, many of the colonies began to produce an abundance of resources, which became vital to many European powers and the British colonies in North America and the Caribbean despite the fact that most of this trade was considered contraband since it was not carried on Spanish ships. Most of the Bourbon kings tried to outlaw this trade through various programs like increasing the customs receipts, with little avail.

An examination of Bourbon intervention in the Peruvian tobacco industry from the mid-18th century to the beginning of the 19th century helps reveal a little more about the nature of the Bourbon administration and its relationship to monopoly policies. Although it is widely accepted that Bourbon officials were effective in the extraction of rents, these conclusions are largely based analysis of fiscal results without a direct connection drawn between monopoly policies and the outcomes of those policies. The overall evolution of monopoly policies suggests that the Bourbons were, in fact, quite aware of organizational problems that plague hierarchies, and that they had a solid understanding of the importance of transaction costs for the sustenance of bureaucracy. This is evidenced in the design of the factory system, which helped vertically integrate much of the market and also helped reduce costs associated with controlling illegal markets. The closing of tobacco factories and similarly perceived ‘failures’ at the end of the 18th century should be read with an understanding of the limitations of the political economy of colonialism and in light of policy changes in Madrid that happened in the context of a tumultuous Europe. Monopoly policies were relaxed in areas where the most conflict arose in response to such policies.

Merchants in Cadiz benefited enormously as a result of these changes. Much wealth accumulated in the hands of the already wealthy peninsular Spaniards. Creole merchants, on the other hand, saw much of their profit decrease with the demolition of monopolies. However, these criollo merchants did not necessarily lose out. Many of them simply shifted their investments to mining, especially in New Spain.

Within New Spain, economic reforms aimed to not just increase revenue, but also to make the Crown essential in the local economy. José de Gálvez, the visitador generál in New Spain and later Minister of the Indies, implemented labor regulation through his "Regulation on Wage and Peonage" (1769). This decree specified wages for free labor workers and set conditions for contract fulfillment and circumstances such as debt repayment. Under the Bourbons, the further systematization of wages impacted the lower economic classes directly and created the organization within society that the Spanish needed for greater economic success and control.

Buenos Aires 
Buenos Aires provided the perfect opportunity to integrate the products of the New World into peninsular Spain. The port city was essential to the process of extraction due to its proximity to the mining empire that was Potosí. Silver would be easily dispatched to the peninsula. Buenos Aires was not solely a beneficial port for the Spanish as it was often the center of illicit contraband along the Atlantic. Buenos Aires housed Jesuits seeking travel to Cordoba or Paraguay and the port could also be described as a "back-door" to the Andes.  Regardless of Buenos Aires having a positive correlation with the Bourbon reforms due its heavy reliance on the flow of silver and Spain's commerce, its reign eventually fell victim to Spain's peninsular conflicts, particularly France.

Taxation 
Cartographical pushes resulted in massive output with extremely specific indications on maps in a manner that was extremely modern. In tandem with this were data-gathering expeditions that were sponsored and sent out to develop a deeper understanding of the colonies. Quantitative and qualitative data were gathered so that systems of taxation could be modified to maximize tax revenue for the crown.

Moreover, the practice of tax-farming ended. Prior to the Bourbon reforms, the practice of tax-farming allowed people, specifically members of the Creole elite, to purchase the right of tax collection from the crown. These people would then pay the crown ahead of time what the expected tax revenue would be, and then they collect taxes themselves afterwards. However, with the elimination of this practice and the transition to direct tax collection, tax rates were thus higher and were also now set at an unnegotiable and inflexible rate. Changes like this were part and parcel of the move on behalf of the Crown to try to regain control of administrative power in the American colonies. Administrative powers had, in the mind of the Crown, previously been too porous for Creoles via mechanisms such as the sale of office and tax-farming.

With regards to the economy, collection of taxes was more efficient under the intendancy system. In 1778, Charles III established the "Decree of Free Trade," which allowed the Spanish American ports to trade directly with one another and most ports in Spain. Therefore, "commerce would no longer be restricted to four colonial ports (Veracruz, Cartagena, Lima/Callao, and Panama)." Tax reductions were given to the silver mining industry as part of the Crown's attempts to stimulate silver production, which had plummeted throughout Spanish America at the beginning of the 1700s. Spain relied heavily on the silver industry for tax revenue, particularly on the mines at Potosí in the Andes. In 1736, the Crown reduced the tax on silver from one-fifth to one-tenth in order to encourage silver production to be reported. Over the course of the 18th century, the market for silver led the port city of Buenos Aires to prominence, and between 1776 and 1783, 80% of the exports leaving the port at Buenos Aires were shipments of silver.

Charles III also initiated the difficult process of changing the complex administrative system practiced under the former ruling family, the House of Habsburg. Corregidores were to be replaced with a French institution, the intendant. The intendancies had the intended effect of further decentralizing the administration at the expense of viceroys, captains general and governors, since intendants were directly responsible to the Crown and were granted large powers in economic and political matters. The intendancy system proved to be efficient in most areas and led to an increase in revenue collection. Intendency seats were mainly based in large cities and successful mining centers. Almost all of the new intendants were Peninsulares, people who were born in Spain, exacerbating the conflict between Peninsulares and Criollos, who wished to retain some control of local administration. The installation of the intendancy system contributed to the further marginalization of the creole elite. It changed the question of who would occupy the positions of Crown officials and shifted the center of influence from landed Creole elites to peninsular Spaniards. Creoles were largely pushed out in favor of peninsular administrators.

The intendancy system was part of the new attitude on the part of the Bourbons to push the economic development of the mother country. The intendants were meant to be promoters of export-oriented economic activity. They were meant to focus on extractive activities, and not manufacturing ones.

Cartography 
The Bourbons launched large projects of information gathering to investigate and record the natural endowments in their American colonies to enable more efficient exploitation of their colonies’ resources. These projects included censuses and large cartographical efforts. Various types of detailed maps were created to display terrain, mineral deposits, bridges and canals, forts, and other important features like mines. Mine-based maps and plans showed plans of mining towns and technical drawings of equipment like winches and ovens which were used in mine production. These maps were used to help the Bourbons fulfil their other reform goals, such as revitalizing old mines and creating new ones. They also used these maps to be able to levy more efficient taxes upon their colonies based on what they consumed and produced in abundance.

Agriculture 
In terms of agriculture, the Bourbons established state monopolies over crops and established state monopoly over purchases, too. They specifically focused on commercial export crops like sugar, indigo, cochineal, tobacco, and cacao. The State was the one in charge of taking primary products and transforming them into consumable final products. Through this entire process, the crown was focused on capturing tax revenue. Additionally, Spanish merchants were pushed upwards as a result of these changes. This shift to a focus on export crops and commercial agriculture further altered and limited the autonomy and functionality of the colonies, as they became resources in a system of direct extraction for the Spanish Empire. This boosted a need for trade between Spain and the colonies as they exported raw goods and needed to receive back the processed and manufactured resources of Spain.

Military 
The Bourbon reforms brought a different stratagem to military organization in Latin America. The reforms focused on a strong relationship with the cabildos, and compositions of councils chosen by the wealthy creoles. Due to a fear amongst the Bourbons of a potential penetration of their empire by other European empires, they engaged in the construction of fortresses and garrisons and created and heavily promoted militias composed of people of a variety of backgrounds and races to supplement their army. The military was a place where creoles still enjoyed a political space within the bourbon reforms. In fact, the Bourbons encouraged the creation of militia under Creole control. The Creoles were also tasked with founding municipalities and collecting revenue in order to support their militias and build fortifications. Shortly, the militias soon became significantly larger and more powerful than the standing Spanish army. In New Spain alone, there was 6000 Spanish soldiers to 23,000 militia. Some believe that militias were often created along race lines, with militias for whites, blacks and mixed race people. However, other studies indicate that the men in militias were from all races, most of them being mixed-race.  These militias aided the supplement of a standing Spanish army, which, at the time, was occupied with conflicts on the home front. Eventually, the militias formed the base for independent armies, and turned on the Spanish. Outnumbered and already indulged in conflict abroad, Spain was put in a difficult situation that they created themselves. However, this begs a crucial thought; was the Spanish crown foolish to encourage the creation of these militias? While on the surface this seemed to be a failure from the beginning, the reality was Spain did not have much of a choice but to trust the Creoles. The reality was the Spanish empire was tied down in to many places, and naturally they ran out of resources.

Mining 
The Bourbons implemented a range of mining reforms to reverse the decline of mines in New Spain and in accordance with the Bourbon's goals to increase the wealth of Spain. The mines had been declining due to technological issues and high costs: as tunnels deepened, flooding became easier and it became more expensive and time-consuming to extract mineral ores. Therefore, the Spanish Crown attempted to revitalize the mines and create new ones through a series of reforms. These included giving the mine owners control over labor costs through lower salaries, lowering the prices of gunpowder and organizing its supply more efficiently, as well as a steadier and cheaper supply of mercury which was used for refining silver ores. The reforms also gave tax exemptions to mine production. In 1787, mining ordinances of New Spain and the Tribunal de Minería in Lima were created, to handle and make more efficient mining production. In 1792, the Tribunal opened a new mining school, the Royal Mining Seminary, with limited success.

There was much growth in mine production under the Bourbons, with silver output increasing by over 15 million Pesos in Mexico alone. Some historians attribute this growth to the Bourbon reforms, whereas others attribute it more to the rising investments of entrepreneurs into mining during this period. For example, regarding Zacatecas, a mining region with huge turnover in mining production, historian Tandeter argues that “There the rise of the first quarter of the century can be attributed to individual entrepreneurs.” Entrepreneurial investments allowed for improvements in mining technology and lower costs.

The city of Potosí saw increases in silver production. Mita was still in place, but through purchasing the rights of mita from miners who had been given mita quotas and incorporating themselves into the infrastructure of forcible sale of goods to the indigenous, merchants were still able to participate in mining. These merchants were income-pursuing more than they were profit-pursuing when purchasing the rights of mita, while also seeking profit in the forcible sale of goods to the indigenous. However, to clarify, ‘forcible sale’ is a phrase that ought to be read with caution. The evidence indicates that there were indigenous peoples who would participate in the purchase of goods from these merchants willingly, and that mules used in mule trains helped to facilitate their own internal economy.

The Catholic Church 
The Catholic Church played a major role in the Bourbon Reforms, specifically in the viceroyalties. A vice royalty is basically a territory governed by a viceroy, a ruler exercising authority in a colony on behalf of a sovereign. The Catholic Church was the most widely regarded church among the vice royalties of Spanish America, and the new colonies brought forth an opportunity to spread Catholicism.

The Catholic Church came about as a religious and political entity in the Iberian Peninsula in the fifteenth and sixteenth centuries. From here, missionaries who possessed the banner of Christ came to the Americas for a fresh, new environment for Christianity to thrive. There was a clear alliance between the Church and the Crown in Spanish America. Ecclesiastical institutions were allotted some freedom from the Crown. The fuero eclesiástico, or clerical immunity, granted clergy members immunity from the royal courts. According to this fuero, any civil crime or criminal offense will be heard in front of the ecclesiastical instead of the royal or local court. This privilege was then extended to all clerics, nuns, priests, monks, and friars. This fuero extended to the land owned by the individuals and institutions which means the Spanish Crown could not exercise justice physically nor collect taxes.

Missionizing in maroon societies in Spanish America became essential for the nature of politics of African resistance in the Iberian Atlantic world. The Maroons were Africans who escaped slavery in America and then mixed with the indigenous people. In the sixteenth century, missionizing native peoples was seen as a moral conquest. It was used as a tool of pacification among Africans who escaped slavery and made their home in Spanish America. In Ecuador, Santo Domingo, Mexico, and Panama, imprinting and “pacifying” maroon societies was very dependent on the spread of Spanish Catholicism. Pacification is an attempt to create or maintain peace through agreements and diplomacy. Christianization often conflicted with the relationships the Maroons created with Catholic clerics and created tensions. Spanish cultural hegemony functioned to imprint submission to religious practices. Maroons, as well as other Africans, rapidly learned that Catholicism was necessary for political legitimation. However, bringing Christianity to light did not interrupt the development of localized practices that observed religious traditions of Africans and indigenous Americans. Maroon communities on the coast of colonial Ecuador learned how Christianization became a tool for Afro-Amerindian rebels in Spain's empire and in the African diasporic world. "While an Afro-Christian diasporic identity may have been in its formative stage during the sixteenth century, transfers of knowledge between the old world and the new were readily apparent in European interactions with Maroons on the Esmeraldas coast. This case study of the Maroons of colonial Ecuador will allow us to see in three acts, or phases, how clerical intervention and the discourse of Christian conversion shaped colonization over time: ultimately yielding a modus vivendi between rebel African slaves and Spanish colonial authorities." (Bryant, O'Toole, Vinson, 2012: 96–97).

The reforms caused many religious tensions as well as social tensions. One of the most major modifications in the Bourbon Reforms was the expulsion of the Jesuits. The Society of Jesus, the members being the Jesuits, had become one of the most powerful organizations in the colonies at the time and had a distinct amount of power until the Bourbon Reforms. First, under the 1750 Treaty of Madrid, which orchestrated a land exchange between Spain and Portugal in South America, Spain's intention to give Portugal territory containing a total of seven Jesuit missions sparked intense Jesuit resistance, and war between Spain and Portugal broke out in 1762. In 1767, Charles III of Spain ordered the expulsion of 2,200 Jesuits to be removed from the vice royalties. Of the 2,200 that were exiled, 678 were from Mexico (New Spain) with 75% of the Jesuits from Mexico being Mexican-born.

However, the Jesuits also were more than just a missionary group. They were very clever and influential businessmen and had control over significant portions of the American colonies. Moreover, the Jesuits were a group that emerged from the counter-reformation movement. They came to be functionally as soldiers of the church and therefore had a special allegiance to the papacy. Thus, it was likely in the best interest of the Crown to make sure that the people on the ground in the American colonies would have a stronger allegiance to the Crown than to any other external group.

The expulsion of the Jesuits which was frowned upon among many colonists. Many historians believe that the Bourbon Reforms would bring forth self-confidence for American-born Spaniards. The expulsion of the Jesuits confronted the liberal ideology of the nineteenth century and conservative positions of the time. The expulsion represented aspects of liberal ideology as a need to break away from colonial past, progress and civilization as attainable objectives, education as a neutral term of religious instruction, and the separation of the Catholic Church and state. These factors played a major role in the modernization of Spanish America. Spanish soldiers went to Mexico and rounded up the Jesuits to be exiled to Italy. The Jesuits were then placed on Spanish warships and sent to the Italian port of Civitavecchia. Upon arrival, Pope Clement XIII refused to let the prisoners set foot on papal territory. The warships then went to the island of Corsica, but due to a rebellion on shore, it took a while to let the Jesuits onto the island. Bernardo Tanucci, adviser to Charles III, did not welcome the Jesuits into Naples and the Jesuits were threatened with death if they crossed the border of the papal states back to Naples. Historian Charles Gibson stated that the expulsion of the Jesuits was a "sudden and devastating move" by the Spanish Crown to assert royal control.

Another historical view is that the Jesuits were expelled primarily due to the Bourbons’ need for a scapegoat, following King Charles’ failures in the Seven Years' War and due to riots in Madrid and elsewhere in Spain arising from his reforms. Charles created a commission which blamed the unrest in Madrid on the Jesuits. Along this line of reasoning, historians Andrien and Kuethe argue that “claims of a Jesuit-led conspiracy allowed the crown to find a scapegoat without confronting directly the broad array of popular and conservative political forces opposed to reform”.

Emphasis on the dominant role of the state in ecclesiastical reform sometimes made the church seem defensive and resistant to change and modern ideas. Many nuns of the eighteenth century were resistant and even rebelled against the thought of the church and state joining. Many priests and nuns were hesitant to join forces with the state because they feared the state would gain too much power and try to alter the preexisting ideals and beliefs of the Catholic Church. With the formation of Spanish America, the Catholic Church and the Spanish Crown formed an alliance that lasted for centuries both in the Iberian Peninsula and Spanish America.

These changes are all part of the movement to subjugate the church to the state. Eliminating the fuero also eliminated what the Crown would have likely seen as unnecessary intermediaries, and thus, the bypassing of these intermediaries would make the state stronger. Moreover, ideologically, while these reforms were being implemented, there was a parallel movement happening in Europe to move towards a harder line of separation between Church and State. The Bourbons were, in fact, quite modern in their understanding of the separation between Church and State.

However, the relationship between the Church and the implementation of the Bourbon reforms in Spanish America should not be treated as if it were monolithic and singular. While the above-mentioned trends can be seen when looking at the core areas of Spanish America, even at the height of the Bourbon reforms, missionaries still played an active part in the Spanish-American colonial empire. Missionaries often were sent with presidial soldiers into the wilderness of the moving frontier as an arguably more human and, to the crown, less expensive method of converting, subjugating, and incorporating new indigenous peoples. Although the prevalence of missionary groups might have declined in most areas, there still existed a rhythmic and constantly fluctuating relationship in which missions, the military, and civil settlement in frontier society.

Effects
The Bourbon reforms succeeded in raising revenue and increasing silver production in Spanish America. While the changes in tax collection and trade policy had a significant impact on the economic success of the colonies, the domestic industries suffered under the Bourbon reforms. Changes such as the removal of taxes on Spanish wine and the blocking of local mechanisms of production was intended to encourage the purchase of Spanish products. During this time as local production suffered, the flow of wealth increasingly moved towards the Criollo and bureaucratic elites and away from the lower classes. While in certain regions, such as Buenos Aires, the reforms led to growth and productivity, in other places, particularly in smaller towns or rural regions, the lack of presence of wealthy Criollo elites and the massive disparities in distribution of wealth led to unrest, which eventually manifested itself in complaints, and eventually riots and revolts.

There are various historical interpretations on the success of the Bourbon reforms. Nevertheless, though the legislation passed by the Bourbons did much to reform the Empire, it was not enough to sustain it. Many of these reforms laid the groundwork of unrest that continued to develop and grow until the movements for independence. However, it is necessary to be wary of reading this history as a linear process in which the Bourbon reforms created an unrest that just grew and grew until finally tensions finally snapped and revolts ignited through Spanish America. For example, although it is true that the militias that were created in this era eventually became the base of independence armies, it does not become a significant issue until a while later. There were a series of riots.  However, they generally did not threaten the system in place, they rarely made demands, and they were usually in response to something specific.

It is important when studying the process of these reforms, particularly the economic reforms, that one pays close attention to where the money being generated is going.  Much of it went to the creole elites in the cities, and to bureaucratic elites, and to the Spanish treasure in the Americas. Wealth being generated was not being redistributed to lower classes. This coupled with a general increase in regulations and obligations, especially for the indigenous, contributed to a societal foundation that was untenable for the plebeians of colonial Spanish-American society.

The tensions continued to grow and widespread discontent lead to an increasing number of revolts in the Andean region. In the middle of the 18th century, the number of insurrections rose steadily so there were a dozen or more per decade. From 1750 to 1759 there were 11 recorded, while 20 years later the decade of 1770-1779 witnessed more than 20. The following decade, the Rebellion of Túpac Amaru II drew mainly upon the frustrations of the indigenous community but also included black slaves and Criollos. The cross-class alliance was fleeting, and the insurrection was squashed by the Spanish army. The Revolt of the Comuneros, led by a Criollo, presented demands in Bogota that would benefit the Criollos and Indians but it was not successful. The inhabitants of New Spain, especially the peasant class, experienced the oppression of Bourbons but did not turn to revolt in the same way as their southern neighbors. Rising costs of land, disease, crime and agricultural crises increased tensions in New Spain. Perhaps due to the lack of Aztec identity, the circumstances did not produce a united response like that of the Rebellion of Túpac Amaru II and Revolt of the Comuneros. It is important to note that while a threat, the Tupac Amaru II revolt did not intend to overthrow the Spanish crown. Tupac Amaru himself claimed to have been loyal and merely carrying out the King's will. The unrest in the late 18th century was not motivated by the prospect of independence or enlightenment thinking, and often used traditional Spanish law and Catholic theology in its justifications and reasoning. However, it is seen by some scholars as a precursor to the eventual independence of the American colonies.

Not all rebellions were violent.  In Venezuela, the movement was essentially an economic protest which the government by its response turned into a rebellion; its social base was among smaller farmers and merchants, many of them criollos, and their cry was ‘long live the King and death to the Vizcayans. Even at its height “the rebellion remained a moderate movement, basically a peaceful protest, led by a man who in no way was in no way a revolutionary.” In the end, while the leader was executed, there was limited action and the revolt reduced  privileges for the Caracas company. Therefore, while some of the information in this section is essential, it is important to present the example of the Venezuelan revolt to show that not all of the revolts were bloody.

See also
Enlightenment in Spain
Spanish American Enlightenment
Historiography of Colonial Spanish America
Nueva Planta decrees issued by Philip V, 1707–1716, reorganizing the royal government of Spain

Notes

References
In Spanish unless otherwise noted.

Further reading

General
Paquette, Gabriel B. Enlightenment, Governance, and Reform in Spain and its Empire, 1759-1808. Palgrave Macmillan 2008, 2011.

Economy

 Brading, D. A. Haciendas and Ranchos in the Mexican Bajío: León, 1700–1860. Cambridge, 1978. 
 Brading, D. A. Miners and Merchants in Bourbon Mexico, 1763–1810. Cambridge,  Cambridge University Press, 1971. 
 Buechler, Rose Marie. The Mining Society of Potosí, 1776–1810. Ann Arbor, Syracuse University, 1981. 
 Deans-Smith, Susan. Bureaucrats, Planters, and Workers: The Making of the Tobacco Monopoly in Bourbon Mexico. Austin, University of Texas Press, 1992. 
 Fisher, John R. Commercial Relations between Spain and Spanish America in the Era of Free Trade, 1778–1796. Liverpool, University of Liverpool, 1985. 
 Fisher, John R. Silver Mines and Silver Miners in Colonial Peru, 1776–1824. Liverpool, 1977. 
 Fisher, John R. Trade, War, and Revolution: Exports from Spain to Spanish America, 1797–1820. Liverpool, University of Liverpool, 1992. 
 Liss, Peggy K. Atlantic Empires: The Network of Trade and Revolution, 1713–1826. Baltimore, 1983. 
 Ringrose, David. Spain, Europe and the "Spanish Miracle," 1700–1900. Cambridge, Cambridge University Press, 1996. 
 Socolow, Susan Migden. The Merchants of Buenos Aires, 1778–1810: Family and Commerce. Cambridge 1978. 
 Stein, Stanley J. "Bureaucracy and Business in the Spanish Empire, 1759–1804: Failure of a Bourbon Reform in Mexico and Peru," Hispanic American Historical Review 61(1)19812-28.
 Van Young, Eric. Hacienda and Market in Eighteenth Century Mexico: The Rural Economy of Guadalajara, 1675–1820. Berkeley, 1981.

Government

 Andrien, Kenneth J. The Kingdom of Quito, 1690–1830: The State and Regional Development. Cambridge, Cambridge University Press, 1995. 
 Barbier, Jacques A. Reform and Politics in Bourbon Chile, 1755–1796. Ottawa, University of Ottawa Press, 1980. 
 Brown, Kendall W. Bourbons and Brandy: Imperial Reform in Eighteenth-Century Arequipa. Albuquerque, University of New Mexico Press, 1986. 
 Burkholder, Mark A. and D. S. Chandler. From Impotence to Authority: The Spanish Crown and the American Audiencias, 1687–1808. Columbus, University of Missouri Press, 1977. 
 Fisher, John R. Government and Society in Colonial Peru: The Intendant System, 1784–1814. London, Athlone Press, 1970. 
 Fisher, Lillian Estelle. The Intendant System in Spanish America. Berkeley, University of California Press, 1929.
 Floyd, Troy S. (ed.). The Bourbon Reformers and Spanish Civilization; Builders or Destroyers? Boston: Heath, 1966.
 Hamnett, Brian R. Politics and Trade in Southern Mexico, 1750–1821. Cambridge, Cambridge University Press, 1971. 
 Lynch, John. Spanish Colonial Administration, 1782–1810: The Intendant System in the Viceroyalty of the Río de la Plata. London, Athlone Press, 1958.
 Marichal, Carlos and Matilde Souto Mantecón, "Silver and Situados: New Spain and the Financing of the Spanish Empire in the Caribbean in the Eighteenth Century," Hispanic American Historical Review 74(4) 1994, pp. 587–613.
 McFarlane, Anthony. Colombia before Independence: Economy, Society, and Politics under Bourbon Rule. Cambridge, Cambridge University Press, 1993. 
 McKinley, P. Michael. Pre-Revolutionary Caracas: Politics, Economy, and Society, 1777–1811. Cambridge Cambridge University Press, 1985.

Military

 Archer, Christon I. The Army in Bourbon Mexico, 1760–1810. Albuquerque, University of New Mexico Press, 1977. 
 Campbell, Leon G. The Military and Society in Colonial Peru, 1750–1810. Philadelphia, American Philosophical Society, 1978. 
 Kuethe, Allan J. Military Reform and Society in New Granada, 1773-1808. Gainesville, University of Florida Press, 1978. 
 Kuethe, Allan J. Cuba, 1753–1815: Crown, Military and Society. Knoxville, University of Tennessee Press, 1986.

Church

 Brading, D. A. Church and State in Bourbon Mexico: The Diocese of Michoacán, 1749–1810. Cambridge, Cambridge University Press, 1994. 
 Farris, Nancy M. Crown and Clergy in Colonial Mexico, 1759–1821: The Crisis of Ecclesiastical Privilege. London, Athlone Press, 1968.

Society

 Ladd, Doris M. The Mexican Nobility at Independence, 1780–1826. Austin, 1976. 
 Seed, Patricia. To Love Honor and Obey in Colonial Mexico: Conflicts Over Marriage Choice, 1574–1821. Stanford, Stanford University Press, 1988. 
 Premo, Bianca, "Children of the Father King: Youth, Authority and Legal Minority in Colonial Lima," Chapel Hill, University of North Carolina Press, 2005 ISBN 978-0-8078-5619-2

Spanish colonization of the Americas
18th century in Spain
Reform in Spain